State Highway 332 (SH 332)  is a  state highway in the U.S. state of Texas. The highway begins at a junction with State Highway 36 (SH 36) in Brazoria and heads east to a junction with the Bluewater Highway in Surfside Beach.

History
SH 332 was originally designated on September 25, 1939 as the bridge over the Intercoastal Canal. On January 12, 1950, it was transferred to FM 1460 which had been designated a year earlier to form the bridge to FM 523. On September 27, 1954, the eastern terminus was extended to an intersection with the Bluewater Highway, while the western terminus was extended to FM 521 on September 29, 1954 when FM 1605 was combined with the route. On October 24, 1956, the route was redesignated back to SH 332 and the western end was extended to SH 36 replacing part of FM 521. On August 15, 1989, a concurrency with SH 288 in Lake Jackson was created.

Route description
SH 332 begins  at a junction with SH 36 in Brazoria.  It heads east from this junction to an intersection with FM 521.  The highway continues to the east to an intersection with FM 2004 in Lake Jackson.  Heading towards the east, the highway continues to an intersection SH 288.  The highway intersects SH 288.  It continues to the east to a junction with Business 288 in Clute.  As the highway continues to the east, it intersects FM 523.  SH 332 reaches its eastern terminus at the Bluewater Highway in Surfside Beach.

Junction list

References

Transportation in Brazoria County, Texas
332